Shofner is the surname of the following people:
Austin Shofner (1916–1999), United States Marine Corps officer 
Calvin Grant Shofner (1932–2013), American country singer who performed and recorded under the name Cal Smith
Del Shofner (born 1934), American football wide receiver 
Jim Shofner (1935–2021), American football player and coach 
Strick Shofner (1919–1998), American major league baseball player

See also
Shofner's Lutheran Chapel near Shelbyville, Tennessee, U.S.